Single-ended may refer to:

 Single ended recuperative burner, a type of gas burner used in industrial furnaces
 Single-ended signaling, the simplest commonly used method of transmitting electrical signals over wires
 Single-ended triode, an audio amplifier
 Single-ended playing card